The Chesapeake and Ohio Passenger Depot in Pikeville, Kentucky was built by the Chesapeake and Ohio Railway in 1923.  The station along with a small baggage depot nearby were listed on the National Register of Historic Places on April 23, 1987.

The Chesapeake and Ohio Railway reached Pikeville in 1907.  The depot is a one-story brick structure built in the Classical Revival style of architecture.  About  from the depot is a small, similarly designed baggage station.  At one point, the depot and baggage station were connected by a canopy, which has since been removed.

Until 2015, the building housed the Big Sandy Heritage Center.

The building currently houses Roasted - a locally owned coffee house and cafe.

Footnotes

References

External links
:  Photos from the National Register of Historic Places

Railway stations in the United States opened in 1923
Neoclassical architecture in Kentucky
Railway stations on the National Register of Historic Places in Kentucky
Pikeville
National Register of Historic Places in Pike County, Kentucky
1923 establishments in Kentucky
Former railway stations in Kentucky
Transportation in Pike County, Kentucky
Station